The 2017–18 National League season, known as the Vanarama National League for sponsorship reasons, is the third season under English football's new title of National League, fourteenth season consisting of three divisions and the thirty-ninth season overall.

The National League covers the top two levels of non-League football in England. The National League is the fifth highest level of the overall pyramid, while the National League North and National League South exist at the sixth level. The top team and the winner of the play-off of the Premier division will be promoted to English Football League Two, while the bottom four are relegated to the North or South divisions. The champions of the North and South divisions will be promoted to the Premier division, alongside the play-off winners from each division. The bottom three in each of the North and South divisions are relegated to the premier divisions of the Northern Premier League, Isthmian League or Southern League.

This is the first season to include six teams in the play-offs for each division, with the 4th-7th placed teams participating in the qualifying round and the 2nd and 3rd placed teams qualifying for the semi-finals.

National League

The National League consisted of 24 clubs.

Promotion and Relegation
The following teams changed divisions after the 2016–17 season:

AFC Fylde were the first team to be promoted after a 3–0 win against Boston United on 22 April 2017 clinched them the National League North title. Maidenhead United were promoted on 29 April 2017 after a 3–0 win over Margate, competing in the top tier of non-league for the first time. Ebbsfleet United were promoted on 13 May 2017 after beating Chelmsford City 2–1 in the National League South Playoff Final, returning to the league after a four-year absence. On the same day, FC Halifax Town were also promoted after beating Chorley 2–1 in the National League North playoff final, securing them an immediate return to the league.

Leyton Orient were relegated from League Two on 22 April 2017 after their 3–0 loss to Crewe Alexandra ending their 112-year stay in the English Football League. On 6 May 2017, despite a 2–1 victory over Doncaster Rovers on the same day, Hartlepool United became the second team to be relegated from League Two following Newport County's 2–1 victory over Notts County, ending their 96-year stay in the EFL.

The six teams replace Lincoln City, Forest Green Rovers, York City, Braintree Town, Southport and North Ferriby United. Lincoln City were promoted to League Two after beating Macclesfield Town 2–1 on 22 April 2017. Forest Green Rovers were promoted after beating Tranmere Rovers 3–1 in the 2016–17 National League Playoff Final on 14 May 2017. They were the league's longest serving club, completing nineteen seasons in the top-flight. This is a mantle that has now been passed to Wrexham, who enter their tenth season in the league.

After seven years in the National League and surviving relegation battles over several seasons, Southport were unable to escape the drop and they were the first team to be relegated on 21 April 2017 after a 3–0 loss to Dover Athletic. After just one season in the National League, North Ferriby United were relegated three days later after a 3–1 defeat at Barrow. On the final day of the season, Braintree Town were relegated after losing 2–0 to Aldershot, ending their six-year stay in the league, which also confirmed the club's first relegation in their history. York City's 2–2 draw against Forest Green Rovers was also not enough to save them after Guiseley's last minute equalizer against Solihull Moors confirmed back to back relegations for the Yorkshire club.

Team changes

To National League
Promoted from 2016–17 National League North
 AFC Fylde
 FC Halifax Town

Promoted from 2016–17 National League South
 Maidenhead United
 Ebbsfleet United

Relegated from 2016–17 League Two
 Hartlepool United
 Leyton Orient

From National League
Relegated to 2017–18 National League North
 York City
 Southport
 North Ferriby United

Relegated to 2017–18 National League South
 Braintree Town

Promoted to 2017–18 League Two
 Lincoln City
 Forest Green Rovers

Stadia and locations

League table

Play-offs

Qualifying round

Semi-finals

Final

Results table

Top scorers

Monthly Awards

Each month the Vanarama National League announces their official Player of the Month and Manager of the Month.

Team of the Season

At the end of the season, the National League announced its official team of the season.

National League North

Team changes

To National League North
Promoted from 2016–17 Northern Premier League Premier Division
 Blyth Spartans
 Spennymoor Town

Promoted from 2016–17 Southern League Premier Division
 Leamington

Relegated from 2016–17 National League
 York City
 Southport
 North Ferriby United

From National League North
Relegated to 2017–18 Northern Premier League Premier Division
 Altrincham
 Stalybridge Celtic

Relegated and voluntarily demoted to 2017–18 Midland League Premier Division
 Worcester City

Transferred to 2017–18 National League South
 Gloucester City

Promoted to 2017–18 National League
 AFC Fylde 
 FC Halifax Town

Stadia and locations

League table

Play-offs

Qualifying round

Semi-finals

Final

Results table

Top scorers

National League South

The National League South consisted of 22 clubs.

Team changes

To National League South
Promoted from 2016–17 Southern League Premier Division
 Chippenham Town

Promoted from 2016–17 Isthmian League Premier Division
 Havant & Waterlooville
 Bognor Regis Town

Relegated from 2016–17 National League
 Braintree Town

Transferred from 2016–17 National League North
 Gloucester City

From National League South
Relegated to 2017–18 Isthmian League Premier Division
 Margate

Relegated to 2017–18 Southern League Premier Division
 Gosport Borough
 Bishop's Stortford

Promoted to 2017–18 National League
 Maidenhead United
 Ebbsfleet United

Stadia and locations

League table

Play-offs

Qualifying round

Semi-finals

Final

Results table

Top scorers

References

 
National League (English football) seasons
5
Eng